In physics, a photon gas is a gas-like collection of photons, which has many of the same properties of a conventional gas like hydrogen or neon – including pressure, temperature, and entropy. The most common example of a photon gas in equilibrium is the black-body radiation.

Photons are part of a family of particles known as bosons, particles that follow Bose–Einstein statistics and with integer spin. A gas of bosons with only one type of particle is uniquely described by three state functions such as the temperature, volume, and the number of particles. However, for a black body, the energy distribution is established by the interaction of the photons with matter, usually the walls of the container. In this interaction, the number of photons is not conserved. As a result, the chemical potential of the black-body photon gas is zero at thermodynamic equilibrium. The number of state variables needed to describe a black-body state is thus reduced from three to two (e.g. temperature and volume).

Thermodynamics of a black body photon gas
In a classical ideal gas with massive particles, the energy of the particles is distributed according to a Maxwell–Boltzmann distribution. This distribution is established as the particles collide with each other, exchanging energy (and momentum) in the process. In a photon gas, there will also be an equilibrium distribution, but photons do not collide with each other (except under very extreme conditions, see two-photon physics), so the equilibrium distribution must be established by other means. The most common way that an equilibrium distribution is established is by the interaction of the photons with matter. If the photons are absorbed and emitted by the walls of the system containing the photon gas, and the walls are at a particular temperature, then the equilibrium distribution for the photons will be a black-body distribution at that temperature.

A very important difference between a Bose gas (gas of massive bosons) and a photon gas with a black-body distribution is that the number of photons in the system is not conserved. A photon may collide with an electron in the wall, exciting it to a higher energy state, removing a photon from the photon gas. This electron may drop back to its lower level in a series of steps, each one of which releases an individual photon back into the photon gas. Although the sum of the photon energies of the emitted photons are the same as the absorbed photon, the number of emitted photons will vary. It can be shown that, as a result of this lack of constraint on the number of photons in the system, the chemical potential of the photons must be zero for black-body radiation.

The thermodynamics of a black-body photon gas may be derived using quantum mechanical arguments. The derivation yields the spectral energy density u which is the energy per unit volume per unit frequency interval, given by Planck's law:

.

where h is Planck's constant, c  is the speed of light, ν  is the frequency, k  is the Boltzmann constant, and T  is temperature.

Integrating over frequency and multiplying by the volume, V, gives the internal energy of a black-body photon gas:
.

The derivation also yields the (expected) number of photons N:
,
where  is the Riemann zeta function. Note that for a particular temperature, the particle number N varies with the volume in a fixed manner, adjusting itself to have a constant density of photons.

If we note that the equation of state for an ultra-relativistic quantum gas (which inherently describes photons) is given by
,
then we can combine the above formulas to produce an equation of state that looks much like that of an ideal gas:
.

The following table summarizes the thermodynamic state functions for a black-body photon gas. Notice that the pressure can be written in the form , which is independent of volume (b is a constant).

Isothermal transformations
As an example of a thermodynamic process involving a photon gas, consider a cylinder with a movable piston. The interior walls of the cylinder are "black" in order that the temperature of the photons can be maintained at a particular temperature. This means that the space inside the cylinder will contain a blackbody-distributed photon gas. Unlike a massive gas, this gas will exist without the photons being introduced from the outside – the walls will provide the photons for the gas. Suppose the piston is pushed all the way into the cylinder so that there is an extremely small volume. The photon gas inside the volume will press against the piston, moving it outward, and in order for the transformation to be isothermic, a counter force of almost the same value will have to be applied to the piston so that the motion of the piston is very slow. This force will be equal to the pressure times the cross sectional area (A ) of the piston. This process can be continued at a constant temperature until the photon gas is at a volume V0 . Integrating the force over the distance (x ) traveled yields the total work done to create this photon gas at this volume
,

where the relationship V = Ax  has been used. Defining
.

The pressure is
.

Integrating, the work done is just
.

The amount of heat that must be added in order to create the gas is

.

where H0 is the enthalpy at the end of the transformation. It is seen that the enthalpy is the amount of energy needed to create the photon gas.

See also

Gas in a box – derivation of distribution functions for all ideal gases
Bose gas
Fermi gas
Planck's law of black-body radiation – the distribution of photon energies as a function of frequency or wavelength
Stefan–Boltzmann law – the total flux emitted by a black body
Radiation pressure

Further reading

References

Photons
Thermodynamics
Statistical mechanics